Variseia or Varisha is an abandoned village inside the Buffer Zone, near Gailini, Cyprus.

References

Communities in Nicosia District